The 2017 QBE Insurance Australian FIM Speedway Grand Prix was the 12th and final race meeting of the 2017 Speedway Grand Prix season. It took place on 28 October at the Etihad Stadium in Melbourne, Australia.

Riders 
First reserve Peter Kildemand replaced Greg Hancock, second reserve Martin Smolinski replaced Nicki Pedersen, first track reserve Justin Sedgmen replaced Niels-Kristian Iversen and second track reserve Davey Watt replaced Fredrik Lindgren. The Speedway Grand Prix Commission also nominated Sam Masters as the wild card, and Brady Kurtz and Rohan Tungate as third and fourth track Reserves.

Results 
The Grand Prix was won by Australia's Jason Doyle, who beat Tai Woffinden, Bartosz Zmarzlik and Patryk Dudek in the final. It was second Grand Prix win of the season for Doyle, and the sixth of his career. He also wrapped up the world title in the 10th heat of the night, becoming the first Australian to win the world title on home soil. He also set the record for the most final appearances in one season with 10.

Heat details

Final classification

References

See also 
 Motorcycle speedway

Australia
Speedway Grand Prix
2017 in Australian sport